A doof or bush doof is a slang term for a type of outdoor dance party in Australia, usually featuring psychedelic trance music.

Doof may also refer to:
 Doof (musician) or Nicholas Barber (born 1968), a London-based psychedelic trance musician 
 "Doof, Doof, Doof", a 2005 short story by New Zealand author Paul Haines
 Doof Festival, an annual psychedelic trance festival in Israel, and Doof Records, the company that sponsors it

See also
 Doofus (disambiguation)
 Dr. Heinz Doofenshmirtz, a character on the television series Phineas and Ferb